This Thing Called Love: The Greatest Hits of Alexander O'Neal is a compilation album by American recording artist Alexander O'Neal, released in 1992 by Tabu Records. It includes tracks from three of O'Neal's previous studio albums: Alexander O'Neal (1985), Hearsay (1987) and All True Man (1991).

Track listing
All tracks written by James Harris III and Terry Lewis, except where noted.

Personnel
Track 1 produced by Jellybean Johnson for Flyte Time Productions Inc.
Tracks 2–7 and 9–15 produced by Jimmy Jam and Terry Lewis for Flyte Time Productions Inc.
Track 8 produced by Monte Moir

Charts and certifications

Weekly charts

Certifications

Release history

References

External links
 This Thing Called Love: The Greatest Hits of Alexander O'Neal at Discogs

1992 compilation albums
Alexander O'Neal albums
Tabu Records albums
Albums produced by Jimmy Jam and Terry Lewis